Vagabond ("with neither shelter nor law") is a 1985 French drama film directed by Agnès Varda, featuring Sandrine Bonnaire. It tells the story of a young woman, a vagabond, who wanders through the Languedoc-Roussillon wine country one winter. The film premiered at the 42nd Venice International Film Festival, where it won the Golden Lion. Vagabond was nominated for four César Awards, with Bonnaire winning Best Actress. The film was the 36th highest-grossing film of the year with a total of 1,080,143 admissions in France.

Plot
The film begins with the contorted body of a young woman lying in a ditch, covered in frost. From this image, an unseen interviewer (Varda) puts the camera on the last men to see her and the one who found her. The action then flashes back to the woman, Mona, walking along the roadside, hiding from the police and trying to get a ride. Along her journey she takes up with other vagabonds as well as a Tunisian vineyard worker, a family of goat farmers, an agronomy professor, and a maid who envies what she perceives to be Mona's beautiful and passionate lifestyle. Mona explains to one of her temporary companions that at one time she was a secretary in Paris but became unsettled with the way she was living, choosing instead to wander the country, free from any responsibility. Her condition worsens until she finally falls where we first encounter herin a ditch, frozen to death.

Cast
 Sandrine Bonnaire as Mona Bergeron
 Macha Méril as Mme Landier
 Yolande Moreau as Yolande
 Stéphane Freiss as Jean-Pierre
 Setti Ramdane as Assoun
 Francis Balchère as Police
 Jean-Louis Perletti as Police
 Urbain Causse as Farmer
 Christophe Alcazar as Farmer
 Joël Fosse as Paulo
 Patrick Schmit as Truck Driver
 Daniel Bos as Demolition Worker
 Katy Champaud as Girl at the Pump
 Raymond Roulle as Old Man with Matches
 Henri Fridlani as The Gravedigger
 Patrick Sokol as Young Man with Sandwich
 Pierre Imbert as Mechanic

Critical reception
The film was acclaimed by critics. Review aggregator Rotten Tomatoes reports that 100% of 20 critics gave the film a positive review, for an average rating of 8.8/10.

Style
Vagabond combines straightforward narrative scenes, in which we see Mona living her life, with pseudo-documentary sequences in which people who knew Mona turn to the camera and say what they remember about her. Significant events are sometimes left unshown, so that the viewer must piece information together to gain a full picture.

It was filmed in the departments of Gard, Hérault and Bouches-du-Rhône.

The title
The original French title, Sans toit ni loi (With neither Shelter nor Law), is a play on a common French idiom, "sans foi ni loi", meaning "with neither faith nor law". It also puns on sans toi ("without you").

Awards and nominations

Notes

References

External links
 
 
 
 
 Vagabond an essay by Sandy Flitterman-Lewis at the Criterion Collection

1985 films
1980s drama road movies
1980s feminist films
Films about wine
1980s French-language films
Golden Lion winners
Films directed by Agnès Varda
Films featuring a Best Actress César Award-winning performance
French drama road movies
1985 drama films
French feminist films
1980s French films